Andrew Buckley may refer to:

 Andy Buckley (born 1965), American actor, screenwriter and stockbroker
 Andrew Buckley (British actor)
 Andy Buckley (hurler) (1884–?), Irish hurler 
 Andrew Buckley (Canadian football) (born 1993), Canadian football quarterback
 Andrew Buckley (field hockey) (born 1973), field hockey player from New Zealand